SFGP may refer to:
Société Française de Génie des Procédés (French Society of Process Engineers)
Special Forces Group (Japan) a Japanese counter-terrorist military unit